Gare de Surdon is a railway station serving the village Le Château-d'Almenêches, Orne department, northwestern France.

Services

The station is served by regional trains to Argentan, Caen, Paris, Le Mans and Granville.

References

External links
 

Railway stations in Orne
Railway stations in France opened in 1867